The SIAI-Marchetti S.700 Cormorano was an Italian proposal for a twin-engined amphibian based on the SF.600 Canguro.

Development
The S.700 was designed to use as much of the SF.600 as possible to build a twin-engined amphibian, changes required included a stronger wing due to the increased all-up weight. The S.700 was a high-wing cantilever monoplane with the ability to land on water or use a retractable tricycle landing gear. The hull and floats were to be made of composite materials and the engines were to be fitted on the upper surface of the wings to protect against spray. It was planned that the aircraft could use the Italian Alfa Romeo AR-318 turboprop with three-bladed tractor propellers.

Specifications

See also

Notes

S.700
1980s Italian civil utility aircraft
Flying boats
High-wing aircraft
Amphibious aircraft
Twin-turboprop tractor aircraft